Aurel is a Romanian-language masculine given name derived from Latin "Aurelius".

People with the name include:
 Aurel Aldea (1887–1949), Romanian general, Interior Minister, and anti-communist resistance leader
 Aurel Babeș (1886–1962), Romanian pathologist
 Aurel Băeșu (1896–1928), Romanian painter
 Aurél Bernáth (1895–1982), Hungarian painter and art theorist
 Aurel Bratu (born 1973), Romanian fencer
 Aurel Braun (born 1947), Canadian political scientist
 Aurel Bulgariu (1934–1995), Romanian handball player
 Aurel Bylykbashi, Albanian politician
 Aurel Ciupe (1900–1985), Romanian painter
 Aurel S. Croissant (born 1969), German political scientist
 Aurél Csertői (born 1965), Hungarian football player and manager
 Aurel Dermek (1925–1989), Slovak mycologist
 Aurél Dessewffy (1808–1842), Hungarian journalist and politician
 Aurél Dessewffy (1846–1928), Hungarian politician
 Aurel Guga (1898–1936), Romanian football player
 Aurel Iancu (born 1928), Romanian economist
 Aurel Jivi (1943–2002), Romanian Orthodox priest
 Aurél von Kelemen (1888–1968), Hungarian tennis player
 Aurel Kolnai (1900–1973), Hungarian philosopher
 Aurel Krause (1848–1908), German geographer
 Aurel Léger (1894–1961), Canadian politician
 Aurel Macarencu (born 1963), Romanian sprint canoer
 Aurel Onciul (1864–1921), ethnic Romanian politician in Bukovina
 Aurel Pantea (born 1952), Romanian poet and literary critic
 Aurel Percă (born 1951), Romanian Catholic bishop
 Aurel Persu (1890–1977), Romanian engineer
 Aurel Popovici (1863–1917), ethnic Romanian Austro-Hungarian lawyer and politician
 Aurel Rău (born 1930), Romanian writer
 Aurel Saulea, Moldovan politician
 Aurel Stein (1862–1943), Hungarian-born British archaeologist
 Aurel Stodola (1859–1942), Slovak engineer, physicist, and inventor
 Aurél Stromfeld (1878–1927), Hungarian general
 Aurel Suciu (1853–1898), ethnic Romanian Austro-Hungarian lawyer and political activist
 Aurel Șelaru (1935–2020), Romanian cyclist
 Aurel Ștefan (born 1950), Romanian fencer
 Aurel Șunda (born 1957), Romanian football player and manager
 Aurel Toma (1911–1980), Romanian professional boxer
 Aurel Țicleanu (born 1959), Romanian football player and manager
 Aurel Vaszin (1885–1979), Romanian-American roller coaster designer
 Aurel Vernescu (1939–2008), Romanian sprint canoeist
 Aurel Vlaicu (1882–1913), Romanian aviation pioneer
 Aurel Wintner (1903–1958), Hungarian-American mathematician

Romanian masculine given names